Warmbat was a USA-based footwear manufacturer that made Australian sheepskin boots, fashion sneakers, work boots and fashionable footwear. This brand was first introduced in Perth, Western Australia in 1969 making it one of the oldest manufacturers of sheepskin boots. The company had offices in Dayton, Ohio as well as Perth.

Background
The company used Aboriginal artwork in its logo and various footwear designs and was one of the largest manufacturers of sheepskin boots in the world that used only Australian sheepskin in its products.

Warmbat is trademarked in 26 countries and was sold in various countries including Australia, the United States, Canada, Hong Kong, Japan, Germany, Russia and the United Kingdom.

Featured in the Australian documentary The Good, the Bad and the UGG Boot, Warmbat competes with Deckers Outdoor Corporation, which owns the trademark "UGG" in the US.

Warmbat sheepskin boots were sold in over 20 countries however, in 2009, the CEO and Founder left Warmbat to start a new sheepskin boot company: Green Lizard Australia.

Warmbat is now owned by a Dutch company and is mainly sold in Europe and Japan.

References
The Good, The Bad and the Ugg Boot
Dayton Daily News February 17th 2007
Dayton Business Journal May 2006
Green Lizard Australia
Warmbat History

External links
Official Website
Crewkicks Website

Shoe companies of the United States